The 880s decade ran from January 1, 880, to December 31, 889.

Significant people
 Al-Mu'tamid
 Al-Muwaffaq
 Charles the Fat
 Alfred the Great
 Al-Mufawwid
 Abdallah ibn al-Mu'tazz
 Basil I

References

Sources